Timobesone is a synthetic glucocorticoid corticosteroid which was never marketed.

References

Enones
Diols
Fluoroarenes
Glucocorticoids
Pregnanes
Abandoned drugs
Thioesters